The tiompán (Irish) or tiompan (Scottish Gaelic) was a stringed musical instrument used by musicians in Ireland and Scotland.

The word 'timpán' was of both masculine and feminine gender in classical Irish. It is theorised to derive from the Latin word 'tympanum' (tambourine or kettle drum) and 'timpán' does appear to be used in certain ancient texts to describe a drum. However, the tiompán was most likely a kind of lyre.

The adjective "timpánach" referred to a performer on the instrument but is also recorded in one instance in the Dánta Grádha as describing a cruit. The feminine noun "timpánacht" referred to the art or practice of playing the tiompán.

In modern Irish traditional music, the word tiompan was used by Derek Bell, after Francis William Galpin's theories, to refer to the hammered dulcimer.

Recorded players included Maol Ruanaidh Cam Ó Cearbhaill (murdered 1329). Finn Ó Haughluinn (died 1490) was the last recorded player of the instrument.

References

Composite chordophones
Medieval Ireland
Culture of medieval Scotland
Harps
Irish musical instruments
Scottish music